Chinchihuasi or Chinchi Wasi (Quechua chinchi a kind of chili pepper, wasi house, "chili pepper house") is one of ten districts of the Churcampa Province in Peru.

Geography 
Other mountains are listed below:

Ethnic groups 
The people in the district are mainly Indigenous citizens of Quechua descent. Quechua is the language which the majority of the population (91.46%) learnt to speak in childhood, 8.08% of the residents started speaking using the Spanish language (2007 Peru Census).

References